Dettol is a cleaning disinfectant and antiseptic. It was introduced in 1932 by the British company Reckitt. In Germany, it is sold under the name Sagrotan.

Prior to 2002, some Dettol products were branded Dettox.

Dettol Antiseptic Disinfectant Liquid

The active ingredient in Dettol that provides its antiseptic property is chloroxylenol (C8H9ClO), an aromatic chemical compound. Chloroxylenol comprises 4.9% total admixture, with the rest made up of pine oil, isopropanol, castor oil, soap and water.

Circa 1978, "household Dettol" contained chloroxylenol (48 g/L), terpineol, and ethyl alcohol.

The original Dettol liquid antiseptic and disinfectant is light yellow in colour in the concentrated form but, as several of the ingredients are insoluble in water, it produces a milky emulsion of oil droplets when diluted with water, exhibiting the ouzo effect.

Dettol Antibacterial Surface Cleanser and Dettol Antibacterial Wipes contain benzalkonium chloride as the active ingredient.

References

British brands
Cleaning products
Disinfectants
Products introduced in 1932
Reckitt brands